Ado is a masculine given name.

People named Ado include:
 Ado Grenzstein
 Ado Vabbe

Estonian masculine given names
Given names